Cristo Ramón González Pérez (born 24 October 1997) is a Spanish professional footballer who plays as a forward for Sporting de Gijón on loan from Italian club Udinese Calcio.

Club career

Tenerife
Born in Santa Cruz de Tenerife, Canary Islands, González started playing in CD Tenerife's youth setup. He later appeared with the first team in the 2014 pre-season, being also called up to the match against SD Ponferradina on 22 August 2014.

On 24 August 2014, before even having appeared with the B side, González played his first match as a professional, coming on as a substitute for Iker Guarrotxena in the 62nd minute of a 1–0 away loss to Ponferradina in the Segunda División. and thus becoming the second-youngest debutant for the club. He scored his first goal in the competition on 31 January of the following year, but in a 3–2 away defeat against Albacete Balompié.

Real Madrid
González signed with Real Madrid on 25 July 2017, being assigned to the reserves in the Segunda División B. He made his competitive debut for the first team on 31 October 2018, replacing Marco Asensio and scoring the final goal in the 4–0 victory at UD Melilla in the round of 32 of the Copa del Rey. His maiden La Liga appearance took place the following 13 January, when he played the entire second half of a 2–1 away defeat of Real Betis after coming on for the injured Karim Benzema.

Udinese
On 19 July 2019, González signed a five-year contract with Udinese Calcio of the Italian Serie A. On 13 August, however, he returned to his home country after agreeing to a one-year loan deal at SD Huesca, scoring six competitive goals during his spell for the second division champions.

González played his first official game for Udinese on 28 October 2020, coming off the bench in a 3–1 win over L.R. Vicenza Virtus in the third round of the Coppa Italia. He returned to the Spanish second tier on 10 December, joining CD Mirandés on loan until the end of the season.

On 28 August 2021, González moved to Real Valladolid on loan for the upcoming campaign. In July 2022, also on loan, he joined Sporting de Gijón also of the second tier with an option to buy.

Career statistics

Honours
Huesca
Segunda División: 2019–20

References

External links

1997 births
Living people
Spanish footballers
Footballers from Santa Cruz de Tenerife
Association football forwards
La Liga players
Segunda División players
Segunda División B players
Tercera División players
CD Tenerife B players
CD Tenerife players
Real Madrid Castilla footballers
Real Madrid CF players
SD Huesca footballers
CD Mirandés footballers
Real Valladolid players
Sporting de Gijón players
Udinese Calcio players
Spain youth international footballers
Spanish expatriate footballers
Expatriate footballers in Italy
Spanish expatriate sportspeople in Italy